Group F may refer to:

 A set of international motor racing regulations used in touring car racing
 One of six or eight groups of four teams competing at the FIFA World Cup
 2022 FIFA World Cup Group F
 2018 FIFA World Cup Group F
 2014 FIFA World Cup Group F
 2010 FIFA World Cup Group F
 2006 FIFA World Cup Group F
 2002 FIFA World Cup Group F
 1998 FIFA World Cup Group F
 1994 FIFA World Cup Group F
 1990 FIFA World Cup Group F